Ashland County is a county located in the U.S. state of Wisconsin. As of the 2020 census, the population was 16,027. Its county seat is Ashland. The county was formed on March 27, 1860, from La Pointe County. The county partly overlaps with the reservation of the Bad River Band of the Lake Superior Tribe of Chippewa Indians.

History
Ashland County was named in honor of the Lexington estate of Kentucky statesman Henry Clay, as one of the founders of the city of Ashland was an admirer of Clay.

Geography
It is the second-largest county in Wisconsin by total area. The Apostle Islands are a small group of islands in Lake Superior, off the Bayfield Peninsula with the majority of the islands located in Ashland County — only Sand, York and Raspberry Islands are in Bayfield County.

Adjacent counties

 Iron County – east
 Price County – southeast
 Sawyer County – southwest
 Bayfield County – northwest
 Lake County, Minnesota – northwest
 Cook County, Minnesota – north
 Ontonagon County, Michigan – northeast
 Gogebic County, Michigan – northeast

Major highways

Railroads
Watco

Buses
Bay Area Rural Transit
Indian Trails
List of intercity bus stops in Wisconsin

Airports
 John F. Kennedy Memorial Airport (KASX) serves the county and surrounding communities.
 Major Gilbert Field Airport (4R5) enhances county service.

National protected area
 Apostle Islands National Lakeshore (part)
 Chequamegon National Forest (part)

Demographics

2020 census
As of the census of 2020, the population was 16,027. The racial makeup of the county was 79.8% White, 13.0% Native American, 0.7% Black or African American, 0.5% Asian, 0.1% Pacific Islander, 0.3% from other races, and 5.6% from two or more races. Ethnically, the population was 2.4% Hispanic or Latino of any race.

2010 census
As of the 2010 United States Census, there were 16,157 people living in the county. 84.6% were White, 11.1% Native American, 0.4% Asian, 0.3% Black or African American, 0.3% of some other race and 3.3% of two or more races. 1.9% were Hispanic or Latino (of any race). 25.6% were of German, 7.6% Finnish, 6.8% American, 6.5% Irish and 5.3% Norwegian ancestry.

2000 census

As of the census of 2000, there were 16,866 people, 6,718 households, and 4,279 families living in the county. The population density was 16 people per square mile (6/km2).  There were 8,883 housing units at an average density of 8 per square mile (3/km2).  The racial makeup of the county was 87.10% White, 0.21% Black or African American, 10.35% Native American, 0.31% Asian, 0.05% Pacific Islander, 0.29% from other races, and 1.69% from two or more races. 1.11% of the population were Hispanic or Latino of any race. 27.8% were of German, 8.4% Finnish, 7.4% Polish, 7.4% Norwegian, 7.3% Swedish and 5.4% Irish ancestry. 96.6% spoke English as their first language.  The reservation of the Bad River Chippewa Band is partially located in the county.

There were 6,718 households, out of which 30.30% had children under the age of 18 living with them, 48.60% were married couples living together, 10.90% had a female householder with no husband present, and 36.30% were non-families. 30.80% of all households were made up of individuals, and 14.40% had someone living alone who was 65 years of age or older. The average household size was 2.39 and the average family size was 3.01.

In the county, the population was spread out, with 25.40% under the age of 18, 11.20% from 18 to 24, 25.80% from 25 to 44, 21.70% from 45 to 64, and 15.90% who were 65 years of age or older. The median age was 37 years. For every 100 females there were 97.10 males. For every 100 females age 18 and over, there were 91.10 males.

In 2017, there were 194 births, giving a general fertility rate of 73.1 births per 1000 women aged 15–44, the eleventh highest rate out of all 72 Wisconsin counties. Additionally, there were no reported induced abortions performed on women of Ashland County residence in 2017.

Communities

Cities
 Ashland (county seat; partly in Bayfield County)
 Mellen

Village
 Butternut

Towns

 Agenda
 Ashland
 Chippewa
 Gingles
 Gordon
 Jacobs
 La Pointe
 Marengo
 Morse
 Peeksville
 Sanborn
 Shanagolden
 White River

Census-designated places

 Bayfront
 Birch Hill
 Clam Lake
 Diaperville
 Franks Field
 Glidden
 Jolmaville
 Marengo
 New Odanah
 Odanah

Unincorporated communities

 Ballou
 Birch
 Cayuga
 Foster Junction
 Highbridge
 Holts Landing
 La Pointe
 Middleport
 Minersville
 Morse
 North York
 Old Fort
 Peeksville
 Penokee
 Petes Landing
 Sanborn
 Sedgwick
 Shanagolden
 White River

Politics
Ashland County is consistently Democratic. It has voted for the Democrat in every presidential election since 1932, with the exceptions of 1952 and 1956 when it backed Republican Dwight D. Eisenhower's two successful bids for the presidency.

See also
 National Register of Historic Places listings in Ashland County, Wisconsin
List of counties in Wisconsin

References

External links
 Ashland County
 Ashland County map from the Wisconsin Department of Transportation

 
1860 establishments in Wisconsin
Populated places established in 1860